Count Mikhail Gavrilovich Golovkin (1699 – 1754, Yarmong in Kolyma) was a Russian diplomat, the Chancellor's son, married to the cousin of Empress Anna Ioannovna. Vice–Chancellor, Head of the Monetary Office, Cabinet Minister in 1740–1741, then in exile until the end of his life.

Life at court
In 1712, he was sent abroad for training. Ten years later, he served as ambassador at the Prussian court in Berlin. Under Anna Ioannovna – a senator, supervised the Mint and the Chancellery. "The favorite of his father, very handsome and well–mannered, Mikhail had a quick and brilliant success", Fyodor Golovkin recalled of his uncle. However, after the death of his father, he did not get into the Cabinet of Ministers, which made him very offended and, in fact, withdrew from doing business.

Under Anna Leopoldovna – Vice–Chancellor for Internal Affairs, one of the most powerful people in the state. Conflicted with Munnich and Osterman, during the overthrow of Biron, he said he was sick, so as not to appear in the palace. He enjoyed the great confidence of the ruler and advised her to declare herself empress, and to conclude Elizaveta Petrovna in a monastery immediately after her coronation. According to Fyodor Golovkin...

Life in Siberia
While Anna Leopoldovna was celebrating her daughter's birthday in Saint Petersburg, the conspirators decided to act and on the night of November 24–25, 1741, Golovkin was arrested. Taken on trial, found guilty of treason, sentenced to death. Elizaveta Petrovna replaced Golovkin's death sentence with eternal exile to Hermang (aka Yarmong). The wife, Ekaterina Ivanovna, was found innocent, she was allowed to live where she wanted, but her faithful wife chose exile with her husband.

All the property of the Golovkins was confiscated and distributed by the favorite of the new empress. "Both spouses were deprived to such an extent that old Chernyshev, the father of three sons who later became famous, with difficulty and risking his own freedom, achieved that they were given a sheepskin coat and twenty–two rubles in money". The exiles were accompanied to Irkutsk by officer Maxim Berg.

Former Count Golovkin spent about 13 years in exile. He had the right to leave the house only accompanied by two armed soldiers. Every Sunday he appeared at the parish church. Once a year, he was obliged to listen to "some paper, and after it the exhortation of the priest".

Mikhail Gavrilovich died in 1754. Pavel Karabanov argued that Golovkin was strangled by his own servants, who were tired of vegetating at the end of the world. His wife buried him in the vestibule of the house in which they lived, turning it into a chapel. A year later, she was allowed to return to Moscow. Ekaterina Ivanovna brought her husband's body with her and buried it in the Saint George Monastery.

Assessments
Kazimir Valishevsky characterizes Golovkin Junior as "a complete nonentity ... which could be bought for fifty thousand". At the same time, according to the characteristics of Mikhail Pylyaev...

References

1699 births
1754 deaths
18th-century diplomats
Ambassadors of the Russian Empire to Prussia
Senators of the Russian Empire